
Acoustic Shards is Buckethead's second special release. It consists of acoustic recordings culled from tapes that were reportedly recorded on July 2, 1991, when Buckethead was 22 years of age.

The album was released on May 31, 2007, by Jas Obrecht, through his label Avabella, who also released the DVDs Young Buckethead Vol. 1 and Young Buckethead Vol. 2.  The album was engineered by Tyler Stipe 

"For Mom" was first released officially on the album Colma (1998) and  "Who Me?" followed on Monsters and Robots (1999).

Track listing

Credits
Buckethead – acoustic guitar
Tyler Stipe – engineer

References

External links
 Avabella's official Young Buckethead site

2007 albums
Buckethead albums